John Hawkes may refer to:

John Hawkes (actor) (born 1959), American film and television actor
John Hawkes (novelist) (1925–1998), postmodern American novelist
John Hawkes (tennis) (1899–1990), Australian tennis player
John Gregory "Jack" Hawkes (1915-2007), British botanist
John Henry Mason Hawkes (1851–1944), South Australian businessman
John Hawkes (horseman), Australian equestrian in the Australian Racing Hall of Fame
John Hawkes (MP) for Bristol (UK Parliament constituency)

See also
Jack Hawkes (disambiguation)
John Hawk (disambiguation)
John Hawke (disambiguation)
John Hawks (disambiguation)